is a Japanese voice actress who works for Aoni Production. She gained more popularity through her roles Rina Takamiya in Saint Tail along with Kōsuke Okano, Yayoi Aida in SLAM DUNK and Sakai in You're Under Arrest alongside Tokyo Seiyū Compatriot Sakiko Tamagawa.

Notable voice roles

Television animation
 Slam Dunk (1993) – Yayoi Aida
 Sailor Moon R (1993) – Grade school student
 Sailor Moon S (1994) – Nurse
 Magic Knight Rayearth (1994) – Caldina
 Sailor Moon Supers (1995) – Manemaneko
 Martian Successor Nadesico (1996) – Erina Won
 Naruto (2005) – Tsubaki
 Non Non Biyori Repeat (2015) – Hotaru's Mother

Unknown date 

 Ceres, The Celestial Legend – Gladys Smithson
 Eden's Bowy – Fennis, young Yorn
 One Piece – Arbell
 Peacemaker Kurogane – Yamazaki Ayumu
 Rizelmine – Natsumi Ibata
 Saint Seiya – Eurydice
 s-CRY-ed – Mimori Kiryu
 Shinzo – Fairy (26)
 Slayers – Additional Voices
 You're Under Arrest – Reiko Sakai

OVA
 Megami Paradise (1995) – Angela
 Miyuki-chan in Wonderland (1995) – Bunny-san, Cho Li
 Debutante Detective Corps (1996) – Miyuki Ayanokouji
 Voltage Fighter Gowcaizer (1996) – Suzu Asahina/Platonic Slave
 Variable Geo (1997) – Erina Goldsmith

Theatrical animation
 Sailor Moon S: The Movie – Snow Dancer
 Martian Successor Nadesico: The Motion Picture – Prince of Darkness – Erina Kinjo Won
 Crayon Shin-chan: The Storm Called: The Battle of the Warring States – Waitress

Tokusatsu
 Gridman the Hyper Agent (1993) – Security, Video cameras

Video games
 Gokujō Parodius! ～Kako no Eikō o Motomete～ – Hikaru (Mini-drama in CD)
Voltage Fighter Gowcaizer (1995) – Suzu Asahina
Super Real Mahjong P7 (1997) – Serika Randoh
Money Puzzle Exchanger (1997) – Note Bank / Mightdealer
 Star Ocean: The Second Story – Opera Vectra
 Black/Matrix – Luca
Dead or Alive 2 – Tina Armstrong
SSX – Kaori Nishidake
SSX Tricky – Kaori Nishidake
Dead or Alive 3 – Tina Armstrong
Dead or Alive Xtreme Beach Volleyball – Tina Armstrong
 Muv-Luv – Kei Ayamine
Airforce Delta Strike - Collette,  Francine
 Samurai Warriors – Kunoichi
Dead or Alive 4 – Tina Armstrong
 Muv-Luv Alternative – Kei Ayamine
Dead or Alive Xtreme 2 – Tina Armstrong
 Edelweiss – Ran Kamoike
Uncharted: Drake's Fortune – Elena Fisher
Uncharted 2: Among Thieves – Elena Fisher
Dead or Alive: Paradise – Tina Armstrong
Dead or Alive: Dimensions – Tina Armstrong
Uncharted 3: Drake's Deception – Elena Fisher
Dead or Alive 5 – Tina Armstrong
Uncharted 4: A Thief's End – Elena Fisher
Dead or Alive 6 – Tina Armstrong
Atelier Ryza: Ever Darkness & the Secret Hideout – Mio Stout
Dead or Alive Xtreme Venus Vacation (2022) – Tina Armstrong

Dubbing roles

Live-action
Sarah Jessica Parker
Sex and the City – Carrie Bradshaw
Failure to Launch – Paula
Sex and the City (film) – Carrie Bradshaw
Did You Hear About the Morgans? – Meryl Morgan
Sex and the City 2 – Carrie Bradshaw
I Don't Know How She Does It – Kate Reddy
New Year's Eve – Kim Doyle
All Roads Lead to Rome – Maggie
And Just Like That... – Carrie Bradshaw
The 4400 – April Skouris (Natasha Gregson Wagner)
Alfie – Nikki (Sienna Miller)
The L Word – Jenny Schecter (Mia Kirshner)
Sherlock – Irene Adler (Lara Pulver)
The Vampire Diaries – Isobel Flemming (Mia Kirshner)

Animation
Star vs. the Forces of Evil – Mina Loveberry

References

External links
 

Living people
Voice actresses from Osaka Prefecture
Japanese voice actresses
Japanese video game actresses
20th-century Japanese actresses
21st-century Japanese actresses
Aoni Production voice actors
Year of birth missing (living people)